Venture Production ltd was a leading British-based oil and gas exploration and production business. Its activities were focused on the North Sea. It was a constituent of the FTSE 250 Index, but was delisted following Centrica's purchase of the company in August 2009.

History
The company was formed in 1997 by Larry Kinch, Bruce Dingwall CBE & Dave Neely to exploit oil and gas reserves in the North Sea. It was first listed on the London Stock Exchange in 2002 and delisted in 2009. In 2008 it acquired six proven but undeveloped gas assets from Tullow Oil.

The founder Larry Kinch was also the founder and Group Chairman of WellDynamics, and PES International Limited which brought to market the industry’s first intelligent well completion system. He started his career as an engineer with Culter Guardbridge Holdings a paper manufacturer, Culter, Aberdeen.

The founder Bruce Dingwall, died on 4th August, 2021 aged 61. He was educated at Fettes College, Edinburgh and Aberdeen University. After graduating he worked as geophysicist with Exxon/Mobil and LASMO (London and Scottish Marine Oil).

The company was sold to Centrica in 2009 after a hostile takeover for £1.3 billion. Management fought for the company as they believed it was valued higher than the 845p a share offer. The chairman of Centrica at the time was William Samuel Laidlaw. Centrica's share price subsequently collapsed as they were unable to successfully deliver assets they acquired from Venture Production, notably the Ensign Gas Field reputed to have lost some £80 million before decommissioning. Centrica's Upstream business was subsequently spun off as Spirit Energy.

Operations
The company's strategy was to develop stranded fields, i.e., fields that were too small to be economic for large companies, needed significant investment or did not fit the strategy of the existing owners. It undertook activities in oil fields and in gas fields.

References

https://www.telegraph.co.uk/finance/newsbysector/energy/oilandgas/5812318/Venture-shareholder-Larry-Kinch-dismisses-Centrica-bid.html

External links
 Official site

Companies established in 1997
Oil and gas companies of the United Kingdom